Kristian Kojola (born 12 September 1986) is a retired Finnish professional football central defender. Kojola started his senior career in Espoo, Finland where he played for the local team FC Espoo before moving to FC Hämeenlinna. He also represented the Finnish national football team.

He retired after the 2018 season.

Club career

Early career

Kojola started his senior career in 2003 in FC Espoo. During season 2005 he made his Veikkausliiga debut in AC Allianssi. Between 2005 and 2007 he represented FC Hämeenlinna. He made his Veikkausliiga break through in 2008 when he gained 16 caps in FF Jaro. He transferred to Tampere United for the season 2010. In the end of 2010 Tampere United was excluded from participating in Finnish football and Kojola moved to IFK Mariehamn.

IFK Mariehamn

He gained 61 caps and scored 3 goals for IFK Mariehamn between 2011 and 2012.

Hallescher FC

Kojola spent season 2013–2014 in German Hallescher FC. He made 36 appearances and scored one goal.

Return to IFK Mariehamn

After his contract with Hallescher expired in 2014 he returned to IFK Mariehamn for the end of 2014 Veikkausliiga season. They won the 2015 Finnish Cup before claiming the 2016 Veikkausliiga title. In Kojola's final season at the team he also served as the team captain.

International career
Kojola played with the Finland national under-17 football team at 2003 FIFA U-17 World Championship in Finland.

Honours

Club
Hallescher FC
Saxony-Anhalt Cup: 2014 Runner-up
IFK Mariehamn
Veikkausliiga: 2016
Finnish Cup: 2015

Individual
Veikkausliiga Team of the Year: 2016

Career statistics

Club

References

External links

 
 

1986 births
Living people
Finnish footballers
Finnish expatriate footballers
Veikkausliiga players
FF Jaro players
Association football defenders
Tampere United players
IFK Mariehamn players
Hallescher FC players
3. Liga players
FC Espoo players
Finland international footballers
Finland youth international footballers
Footballers from Espoo